The 2020 New Mexico wildfire season began in May 2020. At least 543 wildfires burned across the state, with fires burning as late as October 2020. The season was a part of the 2020 Western United States wildfire season.

List of wildfires

References

 
Wildfires
Wildfires in New Mexico
Lists of wildfires in the United States